The Comoros blue vanga or Comoro blue vanga (Cyanolanius comorensis) is a bird species in the family Vangidae. It is found in  the Comoros, where its natural habitats are subtropical or tropical dry forest and subtropical or tropical moist lowland forest.

Subspecies 
Two subspecies are recognised:
 C. m. comorensis (Shelley, 1894): Also known as the Comoros blue vanga, it is found on Mohéli in the Comoro Islands. It tends to be larger than madagarensis and is also exhibits slight differences in colour. It has occasionally been considered as distinct species
 C. m. bensoni Louette & Herremans, 1982: It is found on Grande Comore in the Comoro Islands. It is described from only a single immature specimen, and looks very similar to comorensis. Doubts have been cast on whether it is a distinctive taxon.

It has a ultramarine blue beak with a black tip in males and a dark brown tip in females. The iris is pale blue in adults, while the legs and feet are black or dark slate in colour.

Distribution 
The species is found on the islands of Grand Comore and Mohéli in the Comoros Islands.

It inhabits a variety of woodland on the Comoro Islands.

Status 
The species on the Comoro Islands is threatened by a limited range, deforestation and habitat loss, and degradation of the habitat due to invasive plant species like Syzygium jambos, Lantana camara and Clidemia hirta.

References

Cyanolanius
Birds of the Comoros
Birds described in 1894